The Lynn Valley Tree was the tallest known Coast Douglas-fir (Pseudotsuga menziesii var. menziesii), at a measured height of . It was cut down in 1902. The tree grew in Lynn Valley, now part of metropolitan Vancouver, B.C. Since that time, in the lower valley where the tree grew, the entire old-growth forest has been logged.

It was one of the tallest trees ever recorded, perhaps exceeded only by a small number of Australian mountain ash (Eucalyptus regnans). A Coast Douglas-fir in Washington State, the Nooksack Giant, may have been  taller, but the measurement of the Lynn Valley Tree's height is considered by some more reliable.

See also 
 List of tallest trees

References

Sources
 
 

Individual Douglas firs
Individual trees in British Columbia